The Canal Lauca is an artificial channel to divert the waters of the Lauca River westward through a canal and tunnel into the Azapa Valley for purposes of irrigation in the valley and hydroelectric-power generation. Its construction began 1948 and water diversion began 14 years later from a dam located about 16 miles southwest of Lago Cotacotani Lake.

The canal lies in the commune of Putre in the Arica y Parinacota Region of Chile. It transfers water from the Lauca River into the Rio San Jose for irrigation and hydropower purposes; the endpoint of the canal includes the Chapiquiña power plant which produces .

The canal was put into service in 1962 and is owned by the government of Chile. As a consequence of the construction of the canal, the surface of irrigated land in the Azapa valley increased. This also led to increased immigration from Bolivia into Chile. The construction of the canal led to protests by Bolivians and appears to have primarily favoured large agribusiness.

The Lauca River originates at the Laguna Cotacotani, which in turn receives seepage water from Lake Chungara. It first flows due westward before turning south and later back east into Bolivia.

References

Sources

See also
 Bolivian Chile Boundary
 Canal Lauca

Canals in Chile
Geography of Arica y Parinacota Region
Buildings and structures in Arica y Parinacota Region
Lauca
Lauca
Canals opened in 1962